The 2014 All-Ireland Minor Football Championship is the premier "knockout" competition for under-18 competitors who play the game of Gaelic football in Ireland. The games are organised by the Gaelic Athletic Association. The 2014 series of games started in May with the majority of the games played during the summer months. The All-Ireland Minor Football Final took place on 21 September in Croke Park, Dublin, preceding the Senior Game. In 2014 the title sponsor was Electric Ireland.

In the final, Kerry defeated Donegal by 0-17 to 1-10 to win their first minor title since 1994.

Fixtures and results

Munster Minor Football Championship

Ulster Minor Football Championship

Connacht Minor Football Championship

Leinster Minor Football Championship

All Ireland Series Quarter-finals

All Ireland Series Semi-finals

All Ireland Minor Football final

References

External links
Full Fixtures and Results

All-Ireland Minor Football Championship
All-Ireland Minor Football Championship